Anaachadanam is a 1969 Indian Malayalam-language film, directed by M. Krishnan Nair and produced by M. Raju Mathan. The film stars Prem Nazir, Sheela, Sukumari and Jayabharathi. The film had musical score by G. Devarajan.

Cast
Prem Nazir
Sheela
Sukumari
Jayabharathi
Adoor Bhasi
T. S. Muthaiah
Rani Chandra
Santha Devi
Vanakkutty

Soundtrack
The music was composed by G. Devarajan and the lyrics were written by Vayalar Ramavarma.

References

External links
 

1969 films
1960s Malayalam-language films
Films directed by M. Krishnan Nair